Asian Highway 62 (AH62) is an international route running  from Petropavlovsk in Kazakhstan to Mazar-i-Sharif in Afghanistan. This international highway transits Uzbekistan also.

Route
Petropavlovsk – Arkalyk – Zhezkazgan – Kyzylorda – Shymkent – Zhibek Zholy – Chernyavka – Tashkent – Syrdaria – Samarkand – Guzar – Termez – Hairatan – Mazar-i-Sharif.

Associated routes

Kazakhstan
 : Petropavlovsk - Zhezkazgan.
 : Zhezkazgan - Kyzylorda
 Kyzylorda – Shymkent – Zhibek Zholy

Uzbekistan
 Chernyavka – Tashkent – Syrdaria – Samarkand
  : Samarkand – Guzar – Termez.
  : Termez - Khairaton (Border of Afghanistan)

Afghanistan
 Hairatan Highway : Hairatan - Mazar-i-Sharif : .

See also
 Asian Highway 60
 List of Asian Highways

References

External links
  Treaty on Asian Highways with routes

Asian Highway Network
Roads in Afghanistan
Roads in Kazakhstan
Roads in Uzbekistan